There are two types of minimum off-route altitudes (MORAs): the route MORA and the grid MORA. MORAs give at least 1,000 feet altitude clearance above terrain, and 2,000 feet in mountainous (an area of changing terrain where the changes of terrain elevation exceed 3000 feet within a distance of 10NM) terrain.

Route MORAs provide an obstacle clearance within  on both sides of the airways and within a  radius around the ends of the airways. Grid MORAs provide an obstacle clearance altitude within a latitude and longitude grid block, usually of one degree by one degree. They are presented in feet, omitting the last two figures. Example: 7,600 feet is given as 76. Grid MORA values clear all terrain and obstructions by 1000 feet in areas where the highest elevations are 5000 feet MSL or lower. Grid MORA values clear all terrain by 2000 feet in areas where the highest elevations are 5001 feet MSL or higher.

References

Air navigation
Air traffic control